Chimelong Ocean Kingdom is a theme park situated in Hengqin, Zhuhai, People's Republic of China. It was designed by PGAV Destinations.  The park broke ground on November 28, 2010 and soft-opened on January 28, 2014. The grand opening occurred on March 29 of that year. The first phase of the park cost RMB 10 billion to build. It is part of the Chimelong International Ocean Tourist Resort, which aims to become the "Orlando of China". According to TEA and AECOM, it was the 10th most visited theme park in the world in 2018, with 10.83 million visitors.

The theme park currently has five Guinness World Records under its name.

Rides and shows

Rides

Shows

Themed areas 

There are eight themed areas inside the park, each representing a part of the ocean.

Ocean Avenue 
The entrance area with shops and an LED digital canopy that showcases the sea

Dolphin Cove

Amusement rides 
 Battle of the Pirates – spinning tea cups with shooting water jets
 Dolphin Round Ride – spinner ride
 5D Castle Theatre - Opened in 2015. The castle theatre features a 13-minute animated film called "Kaka's Great Adventure". The film is produced by Prana Studios with Kraftwerk Living Technologies (KLT) providing the hardware. The theatre has a  curved screen, a world record. The theatre took more than three years to plan and cost some ¥300 million (US$50 million) to build.

Animal exhibits 
Dolphin Island and Dolphin Theatre – spotted dolphin habitat
Dolphin Conservation Center – Chinese white dolphin habitat with viewing for guests both above and underwater

Amazing Amazon

Amusement rides 
 Parrot Coaster – Bolliger & Mabillard winged coaster ride

Animal exhibits 
Journey to the Amazon – freshwater aquarium

Ocean Beauty

Amusement rides 
 Deep Sea Odyssey – submarine ride that goes inside the aquarium

Animal exhibits 

Whale Shark Exhibit Aquarium – the tank itself contains  of water, making it the largest in the world, and it is home to whale sharks, manta rays, and many other species at the time of its opening.

Polar Horizon

Amusement rides 
 Polar Explorer – water roller coaster ride

Animal exhibits 

Beluga Experience and Beluga Theatre – beluga habitat
Polar bear Village – Polar bear habitat
Penguin World – Penguin habitat

Hero Island

Amusement rides 
 Bumper Smash – Bumper cars
 Games Arcade – game stalls
 Penguin Coaster
Jungle Coaster
Tower of Sea Monsters

Animal exhibits 
Otter's Den – Asian small-clawed otter habitat
Stingray Encounter – Stingray touch pool
Tide Pools – Touch tanks with small fish and other sea creatures

Mount Walrus

Amusement rides
Spirit of Adventure – pirate ship
Walrus Splash – giant flume

Animal exhibits
Walrus Island – walrus habitat
Sea Lion Bay and Sea Lion Theatre – sea lion habitat
Sea Bird Paradise – Home to pelicans, white cranes, white-naped cranes, white storks, herons, spotted seals, capybaras, green sea turtles, African spurred tortoises, Aldabra giant tortoise and seagulls.

Hengqin Ocean 
Shows, parades, and firework shows

Entertainments
Journey of Lights - Nighttime parade designed by Miziker Entertainment

Killer Whale Breeding Center 

Opened in March 2017, the facility is home to nine killer whales (5 males and 4 females), 6 currently living at the center and 3 temporarily held at another facility. All the killer whales came from Russia and will live here until their new home opens next year.

Two are named Nukka (F) and Tyson (M). Others' names have not been made official yet.

Transportation
The resort has been served by the Zhuhai Changlong railway station on the Zhuhai–Zhuhai Airport intercity railway since 18 August,

Awards and records
In 2015, Chimelong Ocean Kingdom won the Thea Award for Outstanding Achievement over 169 international candidates, marking the first time the award was given to a Chinese theme park.

The Journey of Lights parade won the 2018 Thea Award for outstanding achievement - live show.

Criticism 
Samuel Hung Ka-yiu, chairman of the Hong Kong Dolphin Conservation Society, said, "Ocean Kingdom seems to have imported everything." They are doing everything wrong. "They are doing everything you don't want them to do". Examples include polar bears confined in small areas demonstrating "repetitive pacing, swaying, head-bobbing or circling" and skin disorders in penguins kept in a sub-tropical environment.

Further criticism arises from a recent trade of orcas between China and Russia. In 2013 Russia captured wild orcas in the Sea of Okhotsk, two of which have been sold to China. "Now, a conservation group monitoring the capture of killer whales says it has discovered that Convention on International Trade in Endangered Species of Wild Fauna and Flora (Cites) permits were applied for by Russia and granted for two wild-caught killer whales, also known as orcas, to be exported to China." Ocean Kingdom refuses to comment on whether they plan to display orcas in fthe uture ,but there are currently 50 aquariums in China, none of which have orcas on display.

Attendance

See also
 Chimelong Paradise
 List of tourist attractions in China

References

External links
Official website
Photos: Chimelong's Ocean Kingdom theme park in China Los Angeles Times.
Coaster Forum Review

Zhuhai
Animal theme parks
Amusement parks in China
Aquaria in China
2014 establishments in China
Amusement parks opened in 2014